S. Ryan Smith is an American billionaire businessman. He is the executive chairman and co-founder of Qualtrics, an experience management company based in Provo, Utah, United States. In 2016, he was included in Fortune's "40 Under 40". Ryan Smith is a partial shareholder of two professional sports teams: the Utah Jazz in the NBA and Real Salt Lake in MLS.

In October 2020, Smith agreed to purchase the Utah Jazz from the Miller family for US$1.66 billion, and on December 18, the NBA's Board of Governors unanimously approved the transfer of ownership. In January 2022, David Blitzer and Smith Entertainment Group agreed to purchase Real Salt Lake.

Early life and education
Smith was born in Eugene, Oregon. His father, Scott M. Smith, worked as a university professor and is one of the co-founders of Qualtrics. Ryan's mother, Nancy Smith Hill, holds a Ph.D. in information systems and is an entrepreneur. While he was attending Brigham Young University’s Marriott School of Business, he founded Qualtrics with his father, and his brother, Jared Smith. During his junior year he dropped out of school to spend more time working on Qualtrics, though he eventually returned to school and finished his degree in 2016.

Sports team ownership

Utah Jazz
On October 28, 2020, Gail Miller announced that Smith had agreed to purchase a majority stake in the Utah Jazz NBA franchise. The purchase agreement also included Vivint Arena, the Salt Lake City Stars of the NBA G League, and management of the Salt Lake Bees. Miller had previously put the team into a legacy trust with the objective of keeping the Jazz in Utah. As part of the announcement, Miller stated, "I am fully persuaded that with this sale, the objectives of the trust will be honored, and the new owners have made the same commitment to keep the team in Utah."

Real Salt Lake

Smith, along with New Jersey Devils and Philadelphia 76ers owner David S. Blitzer, were announced as the new majority owners of Major League Soccer club Real Salt Lake in January 2022. The club had been sold by former owner Dell Loy Hansen following controversial comments on civil rights protests by athletes made in 2020. Smith had publicly expressed interest in buying the club as early as September 2020, but delayed further negotiations to instead pursue the Jazz.

Wealth
As of September 2021, Forbes estimated Smith's net worth at $1.6 billion.

Personal life
Smith is married to Ashley. They live together in Provo, Utah with their five children.

Smith is a member of the Church of Jesus Christ of Latter-day Saints and spent two years in Mexico as a missionary.

References

21st-century American businesspeople
American technology chief executives
American billionaires
American technology company founders
Businesspeople from Utah
Marriott School of Management alumni
Living people
National Basketball Association owners
Utah Jazz personnel
Businesspeople from Eugene, Oregon
People from Provo, Utah
Major League Soccer owners
Real Salt Lake owners
1978 births